The Île aux Tourtes Bridge is a bridge on the western tip of the Island of Montreal, spanning Lake of Two Mountains between Senneville, and Vaudreuil-Dorion, Quebec, Canada. It carries 6 lanes of Autoroute 40 and is the main transportation link between Montreal and the province of Ontario. At 2 km in length, it is the longest bridge in Quebec to cross a body of water other than the Saint Lawrence River. It is also commonly known by Montreal's English community as the Lake of Two Mountains bridge.

On May 20, 2021, the government of Quebec announced an indefinite emergency closure of the bridge, after indications that some of the steel reinforcing rods in the bridge support were damaged during routine maintenance work in April. In the interim, the government made travel on the Vaudreuil-Hudson commuter rail line free, and removed tolls from the Quebec Autoroute 30 toll bridge, as alternatives until the Île aux Tourtes Bridge could be safely reopened. The bridge itself was reopened 2 weeks later on June 2, 2021, sooner than the government had anticipated.

See also
List of bridges in Montreal
List of bridges in Canada
 List of crossings of the Ottawa River

References

Bridges in Montreal
Bridges over the Ottawa River
Bridges in Montérégie
Road bridges in Quebec
Bridges on the Trans-Canada Highway
Vaudreuil-Dorion
Senneville, Quebec